This is the list of NATO country codes. Up to and including the seventh edition of STANAG 1059, these were two-letter codes (digrams). The eighth edition, promulgated February 19, 2004, and effective April 1, 2004, replaced all codes with new ones based on the ISO 3166-1 alpha-2 codes. Additional codes cover gaps in the ISO coverage, deal with the imaginary countries used for exercise purposes, and designate large geographical groupings and water bodies (ranging from oceans to rivers). It consists of two-letter codes for geographical entities, four-letter codes for subdivisions, and lists the ISO three-letter codes for reference. The digrams match the FIPS 10-4 codes with a few exceptions.

The ninth edition's ratification draft was published on July 6, 2005, with a reply deadline of October 6, 2005. It replaces all two- and four-letter codes with ISO or ISO-like three- and six-letter codes. It is intended as a transitional standard: once all NATO nations have updated their information systems, a tenth edition will be published.

For diplomatic reasons, North Macedonia was designated as the Former Yugoslav Republic of Macedonia and received a temporary code explicitly different from the ISO one, which was 3166 MKD. Since its name change following the Prespa agreement with Greece, the country is identified with the MK digram and the MKD trigram, but on car license plates, they must be changed to NM or NMK.

The Republic of Palau is also often indicated (at least in the United States) as PW.

Sources
 NATO STANAG 1059 INT (Ed. 7, 2000) Distinguishing Letters for Geographical Entities for Use in NATO
 NATO STANAG 1059 INT (Ed. 8, 2003) Letter Codes for Geographical Entities
 NATO STANAG 1059 INT (Ed. 9 Ratification Draft, 2005) Codes for Geographical Entities
 ISO Online Browsing Platform

References

External links
History of NATO – the Atlantic Alliance – UK Government site
UK MOD Ontology Demonstrator – integrates NATO STANAG 1059 codes with ISO 3166 and FIPS 10-4 codes
NATO Allied Committee 135 – The Group of National Directors on Codification, NATO Codification System (NCS) Country Codes List
 ISO Online Browsing Platform (OBP), 

Country codes
NATO country codes